Belfast is the capital and largest city of Northern Ireland, United Kingdom.

Belfast may also refer to:

Places

South Africa
 Belfast, Mpumalanga, South Africa
 Belfast, Limpopo, South Africa

United Kingdom
 Belfast (Northern Ireland Parliament constituencies) (1921–1973), the largest city and capital of Northern Ireland
 Belfast (Parliament of Ireland constituency) (1603–1800), in present-day Northern Ireland
 Belfast (UK Parliament constituency) (1801–1885)
 Belfast Lough, intertidal sea inlet on the east coast of Northern Ireland

United States
 Belfast, California, in Lassen County
 Belfast, Georgia
 Belfast, Maine
 Belfast Township, Murray County, Minnesota
 Belfast, Missouri
 Belfast, Nebraska
 Belfast, New York, a town
 Belfast (CDP), New York, a hamlet in the town
 Belfast, Clermont County, Ohio
 Belfast, Highland County, Ohio
 Belfast, Licking County, Ohio, a ghost town
 Belfast, Pennsylvania
 Belfast Township, Fulton County, Pennsylvania
 Belfast, Tennessee

Elsewhere
 Belfast, New Zealand
 Belfast, Prince Edward Island, Canada
 Port Fairy, Victoria, Australia, formerly known as Belfast

Arts, entertainment, and media

Music
 Belfast (album), a 2004 album by the Spanish folk metal group Mägo de Oz
 "Belfast" (Elton John song), a 1995 track by Elton John on the album Made in England
 "Belfast" (Boney M. song), a 1977 single by Boney M
 "Belfast", a track on the 2008 album Stainless Style by Neon Neon
 "Belfast", a track on the EP "III" by Orbital 
 "Belfast (Penguins and Cats)", a track on the album Call Off the Search by Katie Melua

Other media
Belfast (film), a 2021 British film.
 Belfast Telegraph, a daily newspaper published in Belfast, Northern Ireland

Military
 Belfast Blitz, German air raids on Belfast in 1941 during World War II
 Belfast Commando, a former light infantry regiment of the South African Army
 HMS Belfast (C35), a Town-class cruiser launched in 1938, now a museum ship in London
USS Belfast, a Tacoma-class frigate in commission from 1943 to 1945 and then transferred to the Soviet Union
HMS Belfast (Type 26 frigate), the third planned of the type
 Short Belfast, a heavy-lift turboprop freighter aircraft

Ships

Other uses
 Belfast Giants, ice hockey team from Belfast, Northern Ireland